The Delanne 30 P2 was a two-seat, French high performance glider built shortly before World War II.

Design and development

The Delanne 30 P2 had a mid-set, gull wing with an aspect ratio of 15 and fitted with camber changing flaps. 

Its tapered fuselage had an oval section, the cockpit seating the two occupants in tandem under a long, multi-part glazed canopy.  The rear seat was close to the wing leading edge. 

It had a rounded fin, with the horizontal tail mounted at half-height.   

The Delanne 30 P2 was on display at the 1938 Paris Salon. It flew until the start of World War II but probably did not survive it.

Specifications

See also
 Delanne 20-T

References

1930s French sailplanes
Glider aircraft
Aircraft first flown in 1937